MPUAT may refer to:

 Maharana Pratap University of Agriculture and Technology
 College of Technology & Engineering, Udaipur